Rabbi Mordchai Rosen was head dean and grand rabbi of the village of Monistrich, known as Monastyrysche in Ukrainian, a town presently in Cherkasy Oblast (province) of Ukraine. He perished during the Holocaust in World War II.

References
 Encyclopedia of Jewish Life (2001), pp. 844–845: "Monastyrishche"
 Shtetl Finder (1980), p. 58: "Monasterishtche"
 Słownik Geograficzny Królestwa Polskiego (1880-1902), VI, pp. 654-658: "Monasterzyska" (Polish)

 

Hasidic dynasties
The Holocaust in Ukraine